Rangpur United is a Bangladeshi football club based in Rangpur. It currently competes in the North Bengal International Gold Cup is an international club football tournament.

History
Rangpur United club from Rangpur which was established on 25 April 2015 by the businesseman Md Reazaul Karim. The club competes in the inaugural edition of North Bengal International Gold Cup an international football tournament as well as several district and divisional football leagues.

Current squad
The club management have not yet announced the squad for upcoming season.

NBGC performance by year

Top goalscorers by season

Head coach records

Club management

Current technical staff
As of 25 October 2022

References

Football clubs in Bangladesh